Retropluma is a genus of heterotrematan crabs belonging to the family Retroplumidae. The extant species survive in the deep sea of the Indo-Pacific region.

Species
Species within this genus include:
 †Retropluma borealis  Fraaife et al. 2005
 †Retropluma craverii  Crema 1895
Retropluma denticulata Rathbun, 1932
 †Retropluma eocenica  Via Boada 1959
 †Retropluma gallica  Artal et al. 2006
 †Retropluma laurentae  Collins et al. 2003
Retropluma notopus (Alcock & Anderson, 1894)
Retropluma planiforma Kensley, 1969
Retropluma plumosa Tesch, 1918
Retropluma quadrata De Saint Laurent, 1989
Retropluma serenei De Saint Laurent, 1989
Retropluma solomonensis McLay, 2006

Fossil record
Fossils of Retropluma are found in marine strata from the Neogene to the Pliocene (age range: from 11.608 to 2.588 million years ago.).  Fossils are known from Italy and Denmark.

References

Crabs
Extant Miocene first appearances
Messinian genera
Zanclean genera
Piacenzian genera
Gelasian genera
Calabrian genera
Ionian genera
Tarantian genera
Holocene genera